For other people with a similar name, see Pedro da Fonseca (disambiguation)

Peter Fonseca  (born October 5, 1966) is a Portuguese-born Canadian politician and former athlete. He is a Liberal member of the House of Commons of Canada, representing the riding of Mississauga East—Cooksville since his election in 2015.

Prior to entering federal politics, Fonseca was a provincial Liberal member of the Legislative Assembly of Ontario representing Mississauga East (2003-2007) and Mississauga East—Cooksville (2007- 2011). He was a cabinet minister in the government of Dalton McGuinty.

Fonseca was re-elected his safe Liberal riding of Mississauga East—Cooksville with roughly 53% of the vote in the 2019 federal election and again with 50% of the vote in the 2021 federal election.

In the 44th parliament which was formed after the 2021 federal election (where the governing Liberals were re-elected with an increased minority), Fonseca was selected as the chair of the powerful Finance Committee.

Background
Fonseca was born in Lisbon, Portugal and immigrated to Toronto with his family in 1968. He was raised in Little Portugal. He graduated from St. Michael's College School and attended the University of Oregon, gaining a Bachelor of Arts on an athletic scholarship. He also holds a Bachelor of Education degree from the University of Windsor. He worked as a senior performance management consultant for the Coach Corporation and has run an importing and distributing company in Portugal.

He married his wife Christine "Chris" Fonseca in 2003. Christine was elected to Mississauga City Council as Councillor for Ward 3 in the 2010 Mississauga municipal election and re-elected in 2014 Mississauga municipal election.

Athletic career
He finished 5th in the 10,000 metres at the 1994 Commonwealth Games. He also represented Canada at the 1996 Olympic Games in Atlanta, Georgia in the Men's Marathon. He was the top finisher for the Canadians, placing 21st overall in a  race with a time of 2 hours, 17 minutes and 28 seconds.  He also placed second in the 1994 Toronto Marathon and the 1994 Houston Marathon, and third in the 1992 New York City Marathon and the 1990 Los Angeles Marathon.

Politics

Provincial
Fonseca was elected to the Ontario legislature in the provincial election of 2003, defeating incumbent Progressive Conservative Carl DeFaria by about 3,000 votes in Mississauga East.  On October 23, 2003, he was named parliamentary assistant to George Smitherman, the Minister of Health and Long-Term Care. In July 2005, he became the parliamentary assistant to Jim Watson, the Minister of Health Promotion.

In October 2007, Fonseca was named to cabinet as Minister of Tourism and Recreation. In a cabinet shuffle on September 18, 2008, Fonseca was appointed as the province's Minister of Labour.

Federal 
On December 16, 2010, Fonseca resigned from the Ontario cabinet to run for the federal Liberals in the riding of Mississauga East—Cooksville. He was defeated by Conservative candidate Wladyslaw Lizon in the 2011 federal election by 676 votes.

Fonseca ran for the Liberals again in the 2015 federal election and defeated Lizon by a wide margin as part of the Liberal sweep of Mississauga ridings.

Fonseca's constituency office was on fire, February 22. Peel Regional Police is investigating the matter as an arson.

Electoral record

Federal

Provincial

References

External links

1966 births
Athletes (track and field) at the 1994 Commonwealth Games
Athletes (track and field) at the 1996 Summer Olympics
Athletes from Mississauga
Canadian male long-distance runners
Canadian male marathon runners
Canadian sportsperson-politicians
Commonwealth Games competitors for Canada
Liberal Party of Canada MPs
Living people
Members of the Executive Council of Ontario
Members of the House of Commons of Canada from Ontario
Naturalized citizens of Canada
Ontario Liberal Party MPPs
Olympic track and field athletes of Canada
Oregon Ducks men's track and field athletes
Politicians from Mississauga
Portuguese emigrants to Canada
Athletes from Lisbon
University of Windsor alumni
21st-century Canadian politicians